Jeffrey Dowtin Jr. (born May 10, 1997) is an American professional basketball player for the Toronto Raptors of the National Basketball Association, on a two-way contract with the Raptors 905 of the NBA G League. He played college basketball for the Rhode Island Rams.

High school career
Dowtin attended St. John's College, where he averaged 15.3 points and 5.0 assists per game as a senior, leading the Cadets to a 29–5 record, including a 16–2 mark in the Washington Catholic Athletic Conference, and was named to the 2015–16 Washington Post All-Met Second Team while also earning All-DCSAA and All-WCAC honors. In 2016, he was identified as a three-star recruit by Scout, Rivals, and ESPN and was ranked the #43 point guard in the nation by ESPN and the 21st-best combo guard by 247Sports.

College career
Dowtin played college basketball for Rhode Island, where he appeared in 128 games and averaged 11 points, 2.8 rebounds, 3.7 assists, and 1 steal, while shooting 44.7% from the field and 36.1% from behind the 3-point line. Dowtin also helped lead the Rams to two NCAA tournament appearances, in 2017 and 2018.  As a senior, he averaged 13.9 points, 3.5 rebounds, and 3.2 assists, earning a spot in the All-Atlantic 10 third team.

Professional career

Lakeland Magic (2021)
After going undrafted in the 2020 NBA draft, Dowtin signed on December 19, 2020, an Exhibit 10 deal with the Orlando Magic and was waived the same day. On January 24, 2021, he signed as an affiliate player with the Lakeland Magic of the NBA G League, where he played 15 games and averaged 6.5 points, 1.6 rebounds and 2.5 assists in 19.8 minutes. Lakeland ended up winning the G League championship against the Delaware Blue Coats, with Dowtin scoring 8 points from the bench.

Golden State Warriors (2021–2022)
On September 8, 2021, Dowtin signed with the Orlando Magic. However, he was waived at the end of training camp. On October 18, he was claimed off waivers by the Golden State Warriors, later turning his deal into a two-way contract with the Santa Cruz Warriors. On January 2, 2022, he was waived by the Warriors.

Milwaukee Bucks (2022)
On January 7, 2022, Dowtin signed a 10-day contract with the Milwaukee Bucks. On January 12, he was assigned to the Wisconsin Herd of the G League following one appearance for the Bucks.

Orlando / Lakeland Magic (2022)
On January 19, 2022, Dowtin was reacquired by the Lakeland Magic. He was removed from the team on January 28, but was re-acquired on February 1.

On March 22, 2022, Dowtin signed a 10-day contract with the Orlando Magic and on April 1, he was re-acquired by Lakeland.

Dowtin joined the Toronto Raptors for the 2022 NBA Summer League.

Toronto Raptors (2022–present)
On July 19, 2022, Dowtin signed a two-way contract with the Toronto Raptors.

Career statistics

NBA

Regular season

|-
| style="text-align:left;"| 
| style="text-align:left;"| Golden State
| 4 || 0 || 7.0 || .500 || .000 || — || 1.8 || .8 || .0 || .3 || 1.5
|-
| style="text-align:left;"| 
| style="text-align:left;"| Milwaukee
| 1 || 0 || 3.0 || .000 || .000 || — || .0 || .0 || .0 || .0 || .0
|-
| style="text-align:left;"| 
| style="text-align:left;"| Orlando
| 4 || 0 || 19.3 || .263 || .143 || 1.000 || 2.8 || 1.8 || 1.3 || .0 || 3.3
|- class="sortbottom"
| style="text-align:center;" colspan="2"| Career
| 9 || 0 || 12.0 || .308 || .111 || 1.000 || 2.0 || 1.1 || .6 || .1 || 2.1

Personal life
He is the son of Lesa and Jeffrey Dowtin Sr. and has a sister, Jeleisa.

References

External links
Rhode Island Rams bio
Twitter handle

1997 births
Living people
American expatriate basketball people in Canada
American men's basketball players
Basketball players from Maryland
Golden State Warriors players
Lakeland Magic players
Milwaukee Bucks players
Orlando Magic players
People from Upper Marlboro, Maryland
Point guards
Raptors 905 players
Rhode Island Rams men's basketball players
Santa Cruz Warriors players
Toronto Raptors players
Undrafted National Basketball Association players
Wisconsin Herd players